Eloranta is a Finnish surname. Notable people with the surname include:

 Voitto Eloranta (1876–1923), Finnish schoolteacher, journalist and politician
 Evert Eloranta (1879–1936), Finnish politician
 Kari Eloranta (born 1956), Finnish professional ice hockey player
 Teijo Eloranta (born 1960), Finnish actor and television writer
 Kari Eloranta (born 1963), Finnish professional ice hockey player
 Mikko Eloranta (born 1972), Finnish ice hockey player
 Eeva-Johanna Eloranta, Finnish politician

Finnish-language surnames